The 2020 Cleveland Open was a professional tennis tournament played on hard courts. It was the second edition of the tournament which was part of the 2020 ATP Challenger Tour. It took place in Cleveland, Ohio, United States between 10 and 16 February 2020.

Singles main-draw entrants

Seeds

 1 Rankings are as of 3 January 2020.

Other entrants
The following players received wildcards into the singles main draw:
  Alexander Brown
  James Hopper
  Vasil Kirkov
  Aleksandar Kovacevic
  Raymond Sarmiento

The following player received entry into the singles main draw as a special exempt:
  Denis Kudla

The following player received entry into the singles main draw as an alternate:
  Martin Redlicki

The following players received entry from the qualifying draw:
  Nick Chappell
  Ruan Roelofse

Champions

Singles

 Mikael Torpegaard def.  Yosuke Watanuki 6–3, 1–6, 6–1.

Doubles

 Treat Huey /  Nathaniel Lammons def.  Luke Saville /  John-Patrick Smith 7–5, 6–2.

References

2020 ATP Challenger Tour
2020 in American tennis
2020 in sports in Ohio
February 2020 sports events in the United States
2020s in Cleveland
Tennis in Cleveland